Ice Sports Hall, aka İzmir Metropolitan Municipality Ice Sports Hall is an indoor ice skating and ice hockey rink located within the Aşık Veysel Recreation Area in Bornova district of İzmir, western Turkey. It was opened on September 28, 2010.

Owned by the İzmir Metropolitan Municipality, the venue has a seating capacity of 1,751 spectators.

International events hosted
 2013 IIHF Women's World Championship Division II - Group B Qualification - December 7–9, 2012
 2014 World Junior Ice Hockey Championships – Division III- April 3–12, 2014
 2015 IIHF World Championship Division III- April 3–12, 2015

References

Indoor arenas in Turkey
Ice hockey venues in Turkey
Figure skating in Turkey
Sports venues in İzmir
Sports venues completed in 2010
2010 establishments in Turkey
Bornova District